Kazi Nazrul Islam (24 May 1899 – 29 August 1976) was a Bengali  poet, writer, musician, and is the national poet of Bangladesh. Nazrul is regarded as one of the greatest poets in Bengali literature. Popularly known as Nazrul, he produced a large body of poetry, music, messages, novels, stories, etc. with themes that included equality, justice, anti-imperialism, humanity, rebellion against oppression and religious devotion. Nazrul's activism for political and social justice as well as writing a poem titled as "Bidrohī", meaning "the rebel" in Bengali, earned him the title of "Bidrohī Kôbi" (Rebel Poet). His compositions form the avant-garde music genre of Nazrul Gīti (Music of Nazrul).

Born into a Bengali Muslim Kazi family hailing from Burdwan district in Bengal Presidency (now in West Bengal, India), Nazrul Islam received religious education and as a young man worked as a muezzin at a local mosque. He learned about poetry, drama, and literature while working with the rural theatrical group Leṭor Dôl, Leṭo being a folk song genre of West Bengal usually performed by the people from Muslim community of the region. He joined the British Indian Army in 1917 and was posted in Karachi. Nazrul established himself as a journalist in Calcutta after the war ended. He criticised the British Raj and called for revolution through his famous poetic works, such as "Bidrohī" ("বিদ্রোহী", 'The Rebel') and "Bhangar Gan" ("ভাঙ্গার গান", 'The Song of Destruction'), as well as in his publication Dhūmketu ('The Comet'). His nationalist activism in Indian independence movement led to his frequent imprisonment by the colonial British authorities. While in prison, Nazrul wrote the "Rajbôndīr Jôbanbôndī" ("রাজবন্দীর জবানবন্দী", 'Deposition of a Political Prisoner'). His writings greatly inspired Bengalis of East Pakistan during the Bangladesh Liberation War.

Nazrul's writings explored themes such as freedom, humanity, love, and revolution. He opposed all forms of bigotry and fundamentalism, including religious, caste-based and gender-based. Nazrul wrote short stories, novels, and essays but is best known for his songs and poems. He introduced the ghazal songs in Bengali language and is also known for his extensive use of Arabic, Persian and Urdu words in his works.

Nazrul wrote and composed music for nearly 4,000 songs (many recorded on HMV and gramophone records), collectively known as Nazrul Gīti. In 1942 at the age of 43, he began to suffer from an unknown disease, losing his voice and memory. A medical team in Vienna diagnosed the disease as Pick's disease, a rare incurable neurodegenerative disease. It caused Nazrul's health to decline steadily and forced him to live in isolation. He was also admitted in Ranchi (Jharkhand) psychiatric hospital for many years. At the invitation of the Government of Bangladesh, Nazrul's family took him to Bangladesh and moved to Dhaka in 1972. He died four years later on 29 August 1976.

Early life 
Nazrul was born on Wednesday 24 May 1899 in the village of Churulia, Asansol Sadar, Paschim Bardhaman district of the Bengal Presidency (now in West Bengal, India). He was born into a Bengali Muslim Kazi family and was the second of three sons and a daughter. Nazrul's father Kazi Faqeer Ahmed was the imam and caretaker of the local Pirpukur mosque and mausoleum of Haji Pahlawan. Nazrul's mother was Zahida Khatun. Nazrul had two brothers, Kazi Saahibjaan and Kazi Ali Hussain, and a sister, Umme Kulsum. He was nicknamed Dukhu Miañ (দুখু মিঞা) literally, 'the one with grief', or 'Mr. Sad Man'). Nazrul studied at a maktab and madrasa, run by a mosque and a dargah respectively, where he studied the Quran, Hadith, Islamic philosophy, and theology. His father died in 1908 and at the age of ten, Nazrul took his father's place as a caretaker of the mosque to support his family. He also assisted teachers in the school. He later worked as the muezzin at the mosque.

Attracted to folk theatre, Nazrul joined a leto (travelling theatrical group) run by his uncle Fazle Karim. He worked and travelled with them, learning to act, as well as writing songs and poems for the plays and musicals. Through his work and experiences, Nazrul began studying Bengali and Sanskrit literature, as well as Hindu scriptures such as the Puranas. Nazrul composed folk plays for the group, which included Chāshār Shōng ('the drama of a peasant'), and plays about characters from the Mahabharata including Shokunībōdh ('the Killing of Shakuni), Rājā Judhisthirer Shōng ('the drama of King Yudhishthira), Dātā Kōrno ('the philanthropic Karna'), Ākbōr Bādshāh ('Akbar the emperor'), Kobi Kālidās ('poet Kalidas'), Bidyan Hutum ('the learned owl'), and Rājputrer Shōng ('the prince's sorrow').

In 1910, Nazrul left the troupe and enrolled at the Searsole Raj High School in Raniganj. In school, he was influenced by his teacher, a Jugantar activist, Nibaran Chandra Ghatak, and began a lifelong friendship with fellow author Sailajananda Mukhopadhyay, who was his classmate. He later transferred to the Mathrun High English School, studying under the headmaster and poet Kumud Ranjan Mullick. Unable to continue paying his school fees, Nazrul left the school and joined a group of kaviyals. Later he took jobs as a cook at Wahid's, a well-known bakery of the region, and at a tea stall in the town of Asansol. In 1914, Nazrul studied in the Darirampur School (now Jatiya Kabi Kazi Nazrul Islam University) in Trishal, Mymensingh District. Amongst other subjects, Nazrul studied Bengali, Sanskrit, Arabic, Persian literature and Hindustani classical music under teachers who were impressed by his dedication and skill.

Nazrul studied up to grade10 but did not appear for the matriculation pre-test examination; instead in 1917, he joined the British Indian Army at the age of eighteen. He had two primary motivations for joining the British Indian Army: first, a youthful desire for adventure and, second, an interest in the politics of the time. Attached to the 49th Bengal Regiment, he was posted to the Karachi Cantonment, where he wrote his first prose and poetry. Although he never saw active fighting, he rose in rank from corporal to havildar (sergeant), and served as quartermaster for his battalion.

During this period, Nazrul read extensively the works of Rabindranath Tagore and Sarat Chandra Chattopadhyay, as well as the Persian poets Hafez, Omar Khayyam, and Rumi. He learned Persian poetry from the regiment's Punjabi Moulvi, practiced music, and pursued his literary interests. His first prose work, "Life of a Vagabond" ('Baunduler Atmakahini'''), was published in May 1919. His poem "Mukti" ("মুক্তি", 'Freedom') was published by the Bengali Muslim Literary Journal (Bangiya Mussalman Sahitya Samiti) in July 1919.

 Career 

Kazi Nazrul Islam joined the army in late 1917. Nazrul left the British Indian army in 1920 when the 49th Bengal Regiment was disbanded. and settled in Calcutta. He joined the staff of the Bangiya Mussalman Sahitya Samiti ("Bengali Muslim Literary Society"). He published his first novel Bandhan-hara (বাঁধন-হারা, 'Freedom from Bondage') in 1920, on which he continued to work over the next seven years. His first collection of poems, which included "Bodhan", "Shat-il-Arab", "Kheya-parer Tarani", and "Badal Prater Sharab", received critical acclaim.

Nazrul grew close to other young Muslim writers, while working at the Bengali Muslim Literary Society, including Mohammad Mozammel Haq, Kazi Abdul Wadud, and Muhammad Shahidullah. Nazrul and Muhammad Shahidullah remained close throughout their lives. He was a regular at the social clubs for Calcutta's writers, poets, and intellectuals such as the Gajendar Adda and the Bharatiya Adda. Nazrul did not have the formal education of Rabindranath and as a result his poems did not follow the literary practices established by Rabindranath. Due to this he faced criticism from followers of Rabindranath. Despite their differences, Nazrul looked to Rabindranath Tagore as a mentor. In 1921, Nazrul was engaged to Nargis, the niece of a well-known Muslim publisher, Ali Akbar Khan, in Daulatpur, Comilla. On 18 June 1921, the day of the wedding, upon public insistence by Khan that the term "Nazrul must reside in Daulatpur after marriage" be included in the marriage contract, Nazrul walked away from the wedding ceremony.

Nazrul reached the peak of his fame in 1922 with Bidrohi (The Rebel), which remains his most famous work, winning the admiration of India's literary society for his description of a rebel. Published in the Bijli (বিজলী, "Lightning") magazine, the rebellious language and theme were well received, coinciding with the Non-Cooperation Movementthe first mass nationalist campaign of civil disobedience against British rule. Nazrul explores the different forces at work in a rebel, the destroyer, and the preserver who is able to express rage as well as beauty and sensitivity. He followed up by writing Pralayollas ('Destructive Euphoria'), and his first anthology of poems, the Agni-veena ("অগ্নি-বীণা", 'Lyre of Fire') in 1922, which enjoyed commercial and critical success. He also published a volume of short stories, the Byathar Dan "ব্যথার দান" ('Gift of Sorrow'), and Yugbani ("যুগবাণী"), an anthology of essays.

Nazrul started a bi-weekly magazine, Dhumketu ("ধূমকেতু", 'Comet') on 12 August 1922 that was critical of the British Empire. Earning the moniker of the "rebel poet", Nazrul aroused the suspicion of British Raj authorities. The Police raided the office of Dhumketu after it published "Anondomoyeer Agomone" ("আনন্দময়ীর আগমনে"), a political poem, in September 1922. Nazrul was arrested on 23 January 1923 and charged with sedition. He presented a long argument in the court, an excerpt of what he said:

On 14 April 1923, he was moved from Alipore Jail to Hooghly Jail in Hooghly. He began a 40-day fast to protest mistreatment by the British jail superintendent, breaking his fast more than a month later and eventually being released from prison in December 1923. Nazrul composed numerous poems and songs during his period of imprisonment. In the 1920s, the British Indian government banned many of his writings. Rabindranath Tagore dedicated his play "Basanta" to Nazrul in 1923. Nazrul wrote the poem "Aj Srishti Shukher Ullashe" to thank Tagore. His book Bisher Banshi ('The Flute of Poison'), published in August 1924, was banned by the British Raj. Bisher Banshi called for rebellion in India against the British Raj. Bisher Banshi was read and distributed in secret following the ban.

Nazrul was a critic of the Khilafat Movement in British India which he condemned as "hollow religious fundamentalism". His rebellious expression extended to rigid orthodoxy in the name of religion and politics. He also criticised the Indian National Congress for not embracing outright political independence from the British Empire. Nazrul became active in encouraging people to agitate against British rule, and joined the Bengal state unit of the Indian National Congress. Along with Muzaffar Ahmed, Nazrul also helped organise the Sramik Praja Swaraj Dal (Workers and Peasants Party), a socialist political party committed to national independence and the service of the working class. On 16 December 1925, Nazrul began publishing the Langal ('Plough'), a weekly, and served as its chief editor.

During his visit to Comilla in 1921, Nazrul met a young Bengali Hindu woman, Pramila Devi, with whom he fell in love, and they married on 25 April 1924. Brahmo Samaj criticised Pramila, a member of the Brahmo Samaj, for marrying a Muslim. Muslim religious leaders criticized Nazrul for his marriage to a Hindu woman. He also was criticised for his writings. Despite controversy, Nazrul's popularity and reputation as the "rebel poet" increased significantly.

With his wife and young son Bulbul, Nazrul settled at Grace Cottage, Krishnanagar in Krishnanagar in 1926. His work began to transform as he wrote poetry and songs that articulated the aspirations of the working class, a sphere of his work known as "mass music".

In what his contemporaries regarded as one of his greatest flairs of creativity, Nazrul vastly contributed in profusely enriching ghazals in Bengali, transforming a form of poetry written mainly in Persian and Urdu. Nazrul's recording of Islamic songs was a commercial success and created interest in gramophone companies about publishing his works. A significant impact of Nazrul's work in Bengal was that it made Bengali Muslims more comfortable with the Bengali arts, which used to be dominated by Bengali Hindus. His Islamic songs are popular during Ramadan in Bangladesh. He also wrote devotional songs on the Hindu Goddess Kali. Nazrul also composed a number of notable Shyamasangeet, Bhajan and Kirtan, combining Hindu devotional music. In 1928, Nazrul began working as a lyricist, composer, and music director for His Master's Voice Gramophone Company. The songs written and music composed by him were broadcast on radio stations across India, including on the Indian Broadcasting Company.

Nazrul believed in the equality of women, a view his contemporaries considered revolutionary, as expressed in his poem Naari (women). Nazrul's poems strongly emphasised the confluence of the roles of both sexes and their equal importance to life. His poem "Barangana" (Prostitute) stunned society with its depiction of prostitutes who he addresses in the poem as "mother".
In the poem, Nazrul accepts the prostitute as a human being first, reasoning that this person was breastfed by a noble woman and belonged to the race of "mothers and sisters"; he criticises society's negative views on prostitutes.

An advocate of women rights, Nazrul portrayed both traditional and nontraditional women in his work. He talked about the working poor through his works such as the
poem: 'Poverty' (Daridro).

Nazrul wrote thousands of songs, known collectively as Nazrul Geeti. The exact number is uncertain. The complete text of 2,260 is known, and the first lines of 2,872 have been collected, but according to musicologist Karunamaya Goswami, it is popularly believed that the total is much higher. Goswami has written that some contemporaries put the number near 4,000.

 Religious beliefs 
Nazrul was born an Orthodox Sunni Muslim, but engaged in religious syncretism so often such that he was seen by laymen as only a proud pluralist. Nazrul wrote an editorial in Joog Bani in 1920 about religious pluralism,
In another article entitled Hindu Mussalman, published in Ganabani on 2 September 1922, he wrote that the religious quarrels were between priests and Imams and not between individual Muslims and Hindus. He wrote that the Prophets had become property like cattle but they should instead be treated like a light that is for all men.

Nazrul criticized religious fanaticism, denouncing it as evil and inherently irreligious. He wrote about human equality in his writings. He also explored the philosophy of the Qur'an and Muhammad by writing about them. Nazrul has been compared to William Butler Yeats by Serajul Islam Choudhury, Bengali literary critic and professor emeritus at the University of Dhaka, for being the first Muslim poet to create imagery and symbolism of Muslim historical figures such as Qasim ibn Hasan, Ali, Umar, Kamal Pasha, and Muhammad. His condemnation of extremism and mistreatment of women provoked condemnation from Muslim and Hindu fundamentalists who opposed his liberal views on religion.

Nazrul's mother died in 1928, and his second son, Bulbul, died of smallpox the following year. His first son, Krishna Mohammad, had died prematurely. Pramila gave birth to two more sonsSabyasachi in 1928 and Aniruddha in 1931but Nazrul remained grief-stricken and aggrieved for a long time. His works changed significantly from the rebellious exploration of society to a deeper examination of religious themes. His works in these years led Islamic devotional songs into the mainstream of Bengali folk music, exploring the Islamic practices of namaz (prayer), roza (fasting), hajj (pilgrimage), and zakat (charity). He wrote the song "O Mon Romzaner Oi Rozar Sheshe" on fasting during Ramadan. This was regarded by his contemporaries as a significant achievement, as Bengali Muslims had been strongly averse to devotional music.

Nazrul was not limited to Islamic devotional music but also wrote Hindu devotional music. He composed Agamanis, Bhajans, Shyama sangeet, and kirtan. Nazrul wrote over 500 Hindu devotional songs. However, a section of Muslims criticized for writing Shyama Sangeet and declared him Kafir (infidel). On the other hand, he became displeased with some Hindus for writing devotional songs about Hindu goddesses because he was a muslim. Nazrul's poetry and songs explored the philosophy of Islam and Hinduism. Nazrul's poetry imbibed the passion and creativity of Shakti, which is identified as the Brahman, the personification of primordial energy. He also composed many songs of invocation to Lord Shiva and the goddesses Lakshmi and Saraswati and on the love of Radha and Krishna. Nazrul was an exponent of humanism. Although a Muslim, he named his sons with both Hindu and Muslim names: Krishna Mohammad, Arindam Khaled (Bulbul), Kazi Sabyasachi and Kazi Aniruddha.

 Later life 
In 1930, his book Pralayshikha was banned and he faced charges of sedition by the British Indian colonial government. He was sent to jail and released in 1931, after the Gandhi–Irwin Pact was signed. In 1933, Nazrul published a collection of essays titled "Modern World Literature", in which he analyses different styles and themes of literature. Between 1928 and 1935, he published 10 volumes containing 800 songs, of which more than 600 were based on classical ragas. Almost 100 were folk tunes after kirtans, and some 30 were patriotic songs. From the time of his return to Kolkata until he fell ill in 1941, Nazrul composed more than 2,600 songs, many of which have been lost. His songs based on baul, jhumur, Santhali folksongs, jhanpan, or the folk songs of snake charmers, bhatiali, and bhaoaia consist of tunes of folk-songs on the one hand and a refined lyric with poetic beauty on the other. Nazrul also wrote and published poems for children.

Nazrul's success soon brought him into Indian theatre and the then-nascent film industry. His first film as a director was Dhruva Bhakta, which made him the first Muslim director of a Bengali film. The film Vidyapati (Master of Knowledge) was produced based on his recorded play in 1936, and Nazrul served as the music director for the film adaptation of Tagore's novel Gora. Nazrul wrote songs and directed music for Sachin Sengupta's biographical epic play based on the life of Siraj-ud-Daula. He worked on the plays "Jahangir" and "Annyapurna" by Monilal Gangopadhyay. In 1939 Nazrul began working for Calcutta Radio, supervising the production and broadcasting of the station's musical programs. He produced critical and analytic documentaries on music, such as "Haramoni" and "Navaraga-malika". Nazrul also wrote a large variety of songs inspired by the raga Bhairav.

 Illness and death 

Nazrul's wife Pramila Devi fell seriously ill in 1939 and was paralysed from the waist down. To provide for his wife's medical treatment, he mortgaged the royalties of his gramophone records and literary works for 400 rupees. He returned to journalism in 1940 by working as chief editor for the daily newspaper Nabajug ('New Age'), founded by the Bengali politician A. K. Fazlul Huq.

On hearing about the death of Rabindranath Tagore on 8 August 1941, a shocked Nazrul composed two poems in Tagore's memory. One of the two poems, "Rabihara" (loss of Rabi, or without Rabi), was broadcast on the All India Radio. Within months, Nazrul himself fell ill and gradually began losing his power of speech. His behaviour became erratic, he started spending recklessly and fell into financial difficulties. In spite of her own illness, his wife constantly cared for her husband. However, Nazrul's health had seriously deteriorated and he grew increasingly depressed. He received treatment under homeopathy as well as Ayurveda, but little progress was achieved before mental dysfunction intensified and he was admitted to a mental asylum in 1942. Spending four months there without making progress, Nazrul and his family began living a quiet life in India. In 1952, he was transferred to a psychiatric hospital in Ranchi. Through the efforts of a large group of admirers who called themselves the "Nazrul Treatment Society", Nazrul and Pramila were sent to London, then to Vienna for treatment. The examining doctors said he had received poor care, and Dr. Hans Hoff, a leading neurosurgeon in Vienna, diagnosed that Nazrul was suffering from Pick's disease. His condition was judged to be incurable, Nazrul returned to Calcutta on 15 December 1953. On 30 June 1962 Pramila died, and Nazrul remained in intensive medical care. He stopped working due to his deteriorating health.

On 24 May 1972, the newly independent nation of Bangladesh brought Nazrul to live in Dhaka with the consent of the Government of India. In January 1976, he was accorded the citizenship of Bangladesh. Despite receiving treatment and attention, Nazrul's physical and mental health did not improve. In 1974. his youngest son, Kazi Aniruddha, a guitarist, died, and Nazrul soon succumbed to his long-standing ailments on 29 August 1976. In accordance with a wish he had expressed in one of his poems, he was buried beside a mosque on the campus of the University of Dhaka. Tens of thousands of people attended his funeral; Bangladesh observed two days of national mourning, and the Parliament of India observed a minute of silence in his honour.

 Criticism 
According to literary critic Serajul Islam Choudhury, Nazrul's poetry is characterised by abundant use of rhetorical devices, which he employed to convey conviction and sensuousness. He often wrote without care for organisation or polish. His works have often been criticized for egotism, but his admirers counter that they carry more a sense of self-confidence than of ego. They cite his ability to defy God, or rather orthodox conceptions of God, yet maintain an inner, humble devotion to Him. Nazrul's poetry is regarded as rugged but unique in comparison to Tagore's sophisticated style. Nazrul's use of Persian vocabulary was controversial, but it increased the range of his work.

 Legacy 

The government of Bangladesh conferred upon him the status of "national poet" in 1972. He was awarded an Honorary D.Litt. by the University of Dhaka in 1974 and in 1976
he was awarded the Ekushey Padak by the President of Bangladesh Justice Abu Sadat Muhammad Sayem. Many centres of learning and culture in Bangladesh and India had been founded and dedicated to his memory. The Bangladesh Nazrul Sena is a large public organization working for the education of children throughout the country. The Nazrul Endowment provides funding for research into the life and work of Kazi Nazrul Islam in U.S. Universities like California State University, Northridge and Connecticut State University. Nazrul was awarded the Jagattarini Gold Medal in 1945the highest honour for work in Bengali literature by the University of Calcuttaand awarded the Padma Bhushan, the third-highest civilian award of India, in 1960.

Nazrul's works for children have won acclaim for his use of rich language, imagination, enthusiasm, and an ability to fascinate young readers. Nazrul is regarded for his secularism. His poetry has been translated to languages English, Spanish, and Portuguese. A major avenue is named after him in Dhaka, Bangladesh. Kazi Nazrul University in Asansol, West Bengal, India is named after him and Kabi Nazrul College In Birbhum, West Bengal. Jatiya Kabi Kazi Nazrul Islam University in Mymensingh, Bangladesh is a public university named after him. Kabi Nazrul Government College in Dhaka, Bangladesh is also named after him. There is a cultural institution called Nazrul Academy, which is spread throughout Bangladesh. Kazi Nazrul Islam Airport in Andal, West Bengal, is India's first private greenfield airport. A chair has been named after him in University of Calcutta and the Government of West Bengal has opened a Nazrul Tirtha in Rajarhat, a cultural centre with library, auditorium and movie theatre dedicated to his memory. On May 25, 2020, Google celebrated his 121st birthday with a Google Doodle. On 20 November, 2020, a documentary film about Kazi Nazrul Islam was released in Dhaka titled Biography of Nazrul. There is even a metro station named "Kavi Nazrul" on metro line 1 of Kolkata metro.

 See also 
 List of works of Kazi Nazrul Islam
 Shiulimala'', a book of short stories, written by Kazi Nazrul Islam.

References

Notes

Citations

External links 

 
 
 Kazi Nazrul Islam
 Kazi Nazrul Islam Poem

 
Bangladeshi male musicians
Bangladeshi male poets
20th-century Bangladeshi male artists
20th-century Bangladeshi male singers
20th-century Bangladeshi singers
20th-century Bangladeshi male actors
20th-century Bangladeshi writers
20th-century Bangladeshi musicians
Bengali male poets
Bangladeshi people of Indian descent
20th-century Indian philosophers
20th-century Indian translators
1899 births
1976 deaths
20th-century Bangladeshi poets
Bengali musicians
Bengali Muslims
20th-century Bengali poets
Bengali writers
Deaths from Pick's disease
Deaths from dementia in Bangladesh
Hinduism and Islam
Indian independence activists from Bengal
Indian male poets
Muslim poets
People from Paschim Bardhaman district
Writers from Dhaka
Recipients of the Ekushey Padak
Recipients of the Independence Day Award
Recipients of the Padma Bhushan in literature & education
Translators of Omar Khayyám
Musicians from West Bengal
20th-century Indian male musicians
20th-century Indian poets
Burials in Bangladesh
Indian Army personnel of World War I
British Indian Army soldiers
Poets from West Bengal
20th-century Indian writers
20th-century Indian male writers
Indian male writers
20th-century Bengalis
People from West Bengal
Indian poets
Indian short story writers
Indian lyricists
Bengali-language lyricists
Indian dramatists and playwrights
20th-century Indian dramatists and playwrights
Indian male dramatists and playwrights
Indian essayists
Indian male essayists
20th-century Indian essayists
20th-century essayists
Male essayists
Indian diarists
Indian novelists
Indian male novelists
20th-century Indian novelists
Bengali novelists
Novelists from West Bengal